Hora Police is a 2016 Sri Lankan Sinhala comedy film directed, produced, screenplay by Suranga De Alwis for Sangeetha Films. It stars Mahendra Perera in dual role along with Dhanuskha Iroshani and Gangu Roshana in supporting roles. Music composed by Sarath de Alwis. It is the 1252nd Sri Lankan film in the Sinhala cinema.

Plot

Cast
 Mahendra Perera as Seargent Suwandarathna / Tiger
 Priyantha Seneviratne as Minister Gajasinha
 Ariyasena Gamage as DIG
 Gangu Roshana as Deepthi, Inspector of police (IP) 
 Dhanuskha Iroshani as Pushpa, Suwandarathna's wife
 Samanthi Lanerolle as Susila, Suwandarathna 's mother
 Mark Samson as Lokke
 D.B. Gangodathenna as Namal
 Eardley Wedamuni as Superintendent of police (SP)
 Denuwan Senadhi as White

References

External links
සුරංග ද අල්විස් තෙවැනි සිනමා නිර්මාණය හොරා පොලිස්
‘හොරා පොලිස්’ කෙනෙහිළිකම් ගැන සුරංග ද අල්විස් කෙළින් කතා කරයි

2016 films
2010s Sinhala-language films
2016 comedy films
Sri Lankan comedy films
Films directed by Suranga de Alwis